The G4 nations, comprising Brazil, Germany, India, and Japan, are four countries which support each other's bids for permanent seats on the United Nations Security Council. Unlike the G7, where the common denominator is the economy and long-term political motives, the G4's primary aim is the permanent member seats on the Security Council. Each of these four countries have figured among the elected non-permanent members of the council since the UN's establishment. Their economic and political influence has grown significantly in the last decades, reaching a scope comparable to the permanent members (P5). However, the G4's bids are often opposed by the Uniting for Consensus movement, and particularly their economic competitors or political rivals.

Background
The UN currently has five permanent members with veto power in the Security Council: China, France, Russia, the United Kingdom, and the United States – comprising the victors of World War II. The G4 nations are regularly elected to two-year terms on the Security Council as non-permanent members by their respective regional groups: in the 24-year period from 1987 to 2010, Brazil and Japan were elected for five terms each, Germany for four terms (one term as West Germany and three terms as unified Germany) and India for eight terms. Cumulatively, the G4 has spent 64 years on the Security Council since the UN's inception, with each country serving at least a decade.

Opinions

Support
The United Kingdom and France have backed the G4's bid for permanent seats on the United Nations Security Council. Japan has received support from the United States and the United Kingdom.

All the permanent members of P5 have supported India's bids for permanent seat on the United Nations Security Council (UNSC), but China has previously implied that it is only ready to support India's bid for a permanent seat on United Nations Security Council if India does not associate its bid with Japan.

The United States has sent strong indications to Brazil that it is willing to support its membership; albeit, without a veto. The Council on Foreign Relations recommended that the U.S. government fully endorse the inclusion of Brazil as a permanent member of the Security Council. Brazil has received backing from three of the current permanent members, namely France, Russia, and the United Kingdom.

In the final document of the 2019 BRICS summit, China and Russia say they "reiterate the importance of a comprehensive Security Council reform" and "support Brazil and India's aspiration for more relevant UN roles".

As stated by the Minister of Foreign Affairs Sergey Lavrov at the Raisina Dialogue in New Delhi in January 2020: "I would say the Security Council's main shortcoming is the under-representation of developing countries. We reiterate our position that India and Brazil absolutely deserve to be on the council together with an African candidate, our position is that the purpose of the reform is to make sure that the developing countries enjoy a better treatment in the central organ of the United Nations".

Opposition
There has been discontent among the present permanent members regarding the inclusion of controversial nations or countries not supported by them. For instance, Japan's bid is heavily opposed by China, North Korea, Russia and South Korea who think that Japan needs to make sincere atonements for war crimes committed during World War II.

Under the leadership of Italy, countries that strongly oppose the G4 countries' bids have formed the Uniting for Consensus movement, or the  Club, composed mainly of regional powers that oppose the rise of some nearby country to permanent member status. Uniting for Consensus supports expanding the number of non-permanent security council members and restricting the usage of the veto. The bloc argues that adding more permanent seats to the security council only benefits the nations that gain those seats, and believes that an expansion of the non-permanent membership will make the UNSC both more flexible and more democratic.

In Latin America, Argentina, oppose a seat for Brazil. In Asia, Pakistan opposes India's bid.

Another counter-proposal, the Ezulwini Consensus, was presented by the African Union, calling for the addition of five new non-permanent seats and two new permanent seats to be allocated to African nations, in response to a lack of African representation on the Security Council.

Activity

The G4 suggested that two African nations, in addition to themselves, be included in the enlarged UNSC. In several conferences during the summer of 2005, African Union was unable to agree on two nominees: Egypt, Nigeria and South Africa all lay claim to a permanent African UNSC seat.

A UN General Assembly in September 2005 marked the 60th anniversary of the UN and the members were to decide on a number of necessary reforms—including the enlarged Security Council. However the unwillingness to find a negotiable position stopped even the most urgent reforms; the September 2005 General Assembly was a setback for the UN.

The G4 retain their goal of permanent UNSC membership for all four nations (plus two African nations). In January 2006, Japan announced it would not support putting the G4 resolution back on the table, not to interfere with any effort by the African Union to unite behind a single plan. And meanwhile, Japan's continuing relations with the G4 were not mutually exclusive. G4 issued a joint statement on 12 February 2011, in which their foreign ministers agreed to seek concrete outcome in the current session of the UN General Assembly.

In September 2015, Narendra Modi, the Prime Minister of India, invited the leaders of the G4 for a summit following the adoption of UN General Assembly Decision 69/560 by consensus, which moved forward for the first time. In 2017, it was reported that the G4 nations were willing to temporarily forgo veto power if granted a permanent UNSC seat.

In September 2019, in a joint press statement during the 74th session of the United Nations General Assembly in, the G4 ministers reiterated their strong commitment to an early and comprehensive reform of the UNSC. Bearing in mind that in 2020 the United Nations would celebrate its 75th anniversary, the G4 ministers also expressed their firm hope that the current session of the General Assembly would pave the way for finally moving on the call for an ‘early reform’ of the Security Council and underscored their steadfast support for Africa's representation in both the permanent and non-permanent categories of membership of a future reform.

Current leaders of the G4 Nations

The following are the head of state and heads of government that represent the members of the G4 nations as of 2023:

Current ministerial leaders

See also 
 Group of Five
 List of country groupings
 List of multilateral free-trade agreements

References 

United Nations reform
India and the United Nations
United Nations coalitions and unofficial groups